The Marconi-San Girolamo-Fesca, improperly named simply San Girolamo, is a quarter of Bari, the capital of Apulia. The quarter has about 12,900 residents.

Geography
It covers an area of 6.3 km2 to the north of the city-centre between Libertà and Palese. The current boundaries of San Girolamo-Marconi-Fesca are:
 at north with the Adriatic Sea;
 at west with the strada vicinale Cola di Cagno that it separates itself from Palese-Macchie;
 at east with the quarter Libertà;
 at south with the railway road Bari-Foggia that it join itself together Stanic and San Paolo.

Notes and references

Quarters of Bari